Kati Wilhelm (born 2 August 1976 in Schmalkalden) is a German former professional biathlete. Like most German biathletes she is also a member of the German Armed Forces (Bundeswehr) with the rank of master sergeant (Hauptfeldwebel). Wilhelm resides in Steinbach-Hallenberg, in the Federal State of Thuringia.

Career
Wilhelm was born in Schmalkalden, then East Germany (now in the Federal State of Thuringia, Germany). She started training cross-country skiing as a child in 1983 and was a member of the German cross-country ski team at the 1998 Nagano Olympic Games. In 1999, while attending the Military World Games, she came into contact with biathlon and was hooked on the sport. Her decision to switch to biathlon proved to be a good one. The next year she experienced her first successes including a World Cup victory. During the Salt Lake City Olympic Games in, she was the most decorated female biathlete, winning gold medals in the 7.5 km sprint and the 4 × 6 km relay. She also won a silver medal in the 10 km pursuit. After two years of struggling, she finally moved to Ruhpolding, Bavaria in 2004. She regained her strength and placed second in the 2004–05 World Cup season, defeated only by Frenchwoman Sandrine Bailly. At the 2006 Winter Olympics in Turin, she carried the German flag at the opening ceremony. After winning her third Olympic gold medal in the 10 km pursuit as well as silver in the mass start and with the German relay, she became the best female biathlete at the Olympics ever. Moreover, she dominated the 2005–06 World Cup season, winning six races and the overall World Cup trophy. She was elected "biathlete of the year 2006" as well as "German sportswoman of the year 2006". In total she has 21 IBU Biathlon World Cup wins.

In the 2006–07 World Cup season, she finished second for the overall World Cup title behind teammate Andrea Henkel. In the 2008–09 World Cup season, she finished second for the overall World Cup title behind Helena Jonsson, with both biathletes scoring 952 points. Jonsson was awarded the overall title by virtue of her four World Cup victories against Wilhelm's three.

The German media gave her the nickname "Rotkäppchen" (Little Red Riding Hood) because of her characteristic red hair and the red cap she uses in competition. She was able to translate her Olympic victories into multiple endorsement deals, including print and television advertising. Wilhelm announced her retirement from biathlon on 9 March 2010 so that she could focus on her studies. She took part in the International biathlon competition on the "Prize in memory of Vitaly Fatyanov", Kamchatka 2010. The event was held in Kamchatka, Russia on 15–17 April, where Kati came 3rd in Sprint and won a Pursuit race.

In 2004, Wilhelm was a delegate to the Federal Convention for the Social Democrats.

Wilhelm retired as an athlete after the 2009–10 season.

Biathlon achievements

 Biathlon World Cup
 1 × overall winner (2005–06)
 3 × overall runner-up (2004–05, 2006–07, 2008–09)
 21 individual victories

Cross-country skiing results
All results are sourced from the International Ski Federation (FIS).

Olympic Games

World Championships

World Cup

Season standings

See also
 Germany at the 2006 Winter Olympics

References

External links
  
 
 
 Women's 4 x 5 km cross-country relay Olympic results: 1976–2002 

1976 births
Living people
People from Schmalkalden
German female biathletes
German female cross-country skiers
Olympic biathletes of Germany
Olympic cross-country skiers of Germany
Biathletes at the 2002 Winter Olympics
Biathletes at the 2006 Winter Olympics
Biathletes at the 2010 Winter Olympics
Cross-country skiers at the 1998 Winter Olympics
Olympic gold medalists for Germany
Olympic silver medalists for Germany
Olympic bronze medalists for Germany
Olympic medalists in biathlon
Biathlon World Championships medalists
Medalists at the 2010 Winter Olympics
Medalists at the 2006 Winter Olympics
Medalists at the 2002 Winter Olympics
Sportspeople from Thuringia